George Graham Mangus (May 22, 1890 – August 10, 1933) was a Major League Baseball left fielder who played in ten games for the Philadelphia Phillies late in the  season.

External links

Philadelphia Phillies players
1890 births
1933 deaths
Baseball players from Massachusetts
Baseball players from New York (state)
People from Wayne County, New York
Macon Peaches players
Columbia Comers players
Atlantic City (minor league baseball) players
New Haven White Wings players
Petersburg Goobers players
Norfolk Tars players
People from Rutland, Massachusetts
Sportspeople from Worcester County, Massachusetts